Belmar Gunderson (born September 7, 1934) is an American former tennis player.

Gunderson, the daughter of an Army colonel, was born in Fort Sill, Oklahoma and lived in various other military bases during her childhood, including in post-war Germany where she began playing tennis aged 13.

A diminutive player, Gunderson served as captain of the U.S. junior Wightman Cup side. She celebrated her 21st birthday by beating the second-seeded Louise Brough at the 1955 U.S. National Championships, to reach the quarter-finals stage. As a doubles player she was ranked as high as two in the country, winning titles at the Canadian Championships and U.S. Indoor Championships.

Gunderson retired as a player in 1965 and completed a doctorate at Texas Woman's University. From 1974 to 1976 she served as the first ever women's athletics director for the University of Minnesota.

References

External links
 

1934 births
Living people
American female tennis players
Tennis people from Oklahoma
Minnesota Golden Gophers athletic directors
People from Fort Sill, Oklahoma
Texas Woman's University alumni